Emil Valtchev (born February 23, 1950, died November 02, 2022) was a Bulgarian former volleyball player who competed in the 1972 Summer Olympics and in the 1980 Summer Olympics.

In 1972 he was part of the Bulgarian team which finished fourth in the Olympic tournament. He played all seven matches.

Eight years later he won the silver medal with the Bulgarian team in the 1980 Olympic tournament. He played all six matches.

External links
profile

1950 births
Living people
Bulgarian men's volleyball players
Olympic volleyball players of Bulgaria
Volleyball players at the 1972 Summer Olympics
Volleyball players at the 1980 Summer Olympics
Olympic silver medalists for Bulgaria
Olympic medalists in volleyball
Medalists at the 1980 Summer Olympics